Aleksei Mikhailovich Mitin (born 19 September 1973) is a former Russian professional footballer.

Club career
He played 7 seasons in the Russian Football National League for 4 different clubs.

External links
 

1973 births
Living people
Russian footballers
Association football goalkeepers
Russian expatriate footballers
Expatriate footballers in Belarus
Expatriate footballers in Ukraine
Expatriate footballers in Israel
Expatriate footballers in Kazakhstan
Russian expatriate sportspeople in Kazakhstan
FC Dynamo Bryansk players
FC Torpedo Mogilev players
FC Nyva Vinnytsia players
Maccabi Jaffa F.C. players
Maccabi Kiryat Gat F.C. players
Maccabi Ironi Kiryat Ata F.C. players
FC Kristall Smolensk players
FC Zhetysu players
FC SKA-Khabarovsk players
FC Avangard Kursk players
FC Dynamo Vologda players